Ji Seung-hyun is a Korean name consisting of the family name Ji and the given name Seung-hyun, and may also refer to:

 Ji Seung-hyun (handballer) (born 1979), South Korean handballer
 Ji Seung-hyun (actor) (born 1981), South Korean actor